Hannah Island is an ice-covered island in the Marshall Archipelago, lying between Hutchinson Island and Guest Peninsula within the Sulzberger Ice Shelf, off the coast of Antarctica. It was mapped by the United States Geological Survey from surveys and U.S. Navy air photos (1959–65), and was named by the Advisory Committee on Antarctic Names for J.P. Hannah, a United States Antarctic Research Program ionospheric physicist at Byrd Station in 1968.

See also 
 List of Antarctic and sub-Antarctic islands

References

Islands of Marie Byrd Land